Hyalurga fenestra is a moth of the family Erebidae. It was described by Carl Linnaeus in his 1758 10th edition of Systema Naturae. It is found in Costa Rica, Nicaragua, Panama, Bolivia, Suriname, French Guiana, Brazil, Peru and Venezuela, as well as on the Antilles.

References

Hyalurga
Moths described in 1758
Taxa named by Carl Linnaeus